David Pieter Faure was the founder of the Unitarian Church in South Africa, an interpreter and a Grand Master of the Freemasons in South Africa.

Roots
Faure was born in Stellenbosch, Cape Province, South Africa on 11 November 1842. He was the younger of two sons of Abraham Faure and Dorothea Susanna de Villiers. He married Helena Johanna Augusta Munnik on 17 March 1871. He died in Cape Town on 17 August 1916. He studied theology at the University of Leiden in the Netherlands up to 1866, when he graduated.

Influences picked up in the Netherlands
The denomination under which he studied was Dutch Reformed. He had become aware of different ways of thinking (free thinking). This was expressed to him by Prof. J.H. Scholten. Upon his return to South Africa in 1866, the Dutch Reformed Church had a panel of theological experts that interviewed graduates before admitting them to the church (called Colloquium Doctum (Latin). Due to the liberal influence Faure was under in Holland, he was not admitted as pastor. The Colloquium Doctum  was put in place, as two theological contemporaries of him, Thomas François Burgers from Hanover (1862) and Kotze, J.J. from Darling (1864), were suspended as they differed from the church-prescribed theory.

Founding of the Unitarian Church
In 1867, Faure founded the Unitarian Church. It was first called the Free Protestant Church. He was pastor up to 1897, when Pastor Ramsden Balmforth from England, UK took over. In 1870 his church expanded to Graaff-Reinet.

Faure's belief regarding Charles Darwin's Evolution Theory
On 30 July 1876 he  had a “Discourse” about the Evolution Theory of Darwin. This was done in the church. He believed one could as a Christian accept Darwin's evolutionary theory. It was printed in The Standard and Mail (a newspaper).

Interpreter

The “Fiat Justitia” case 1880
David Faure was a circuit interpreter from 1872-1880.  He was the interpreter in the Koegas murder case. Faure not being satisfied with the case wrote letters to the Argus newspaper. It was address to FJ Dormer the editor. He used a nom de plume - Fiat Justitia. It is Latin for: Let justice always be told. In his letters he said there were racism and deviance from common law. The newspaper published it. Dormer was charged with crimen injuria. The presiding judges were Stockenström, A. and de Villiers, H. These judges at the end judged that obstruction of justice did occur and that racism did take place in the court. Thomas Upington the Attorney General was declared incapable of being in such a public position. Judge  De Villiers praised Faure but still  deprived him of his post. The Argus employed him as an interpreter.

The London Convention
When the Zuid-Afrikaansche Republiek delegation under the leadership of President Kruger travelled to London, UK Faure accompanied them as interpreter. The purpose of the visit was the signing of London Convention This convention controlled the relations between the UK and the Zuid-Afrikaansche Republiek.

Freemason
He was the  Grand Master of Lodge de Goede Hoop (South African Freemasons) from 1893 to 1897, when he took over from Jan Hofmeyer.

Biography
His autobiography was written in 1907.

References 

1842 births
1916 deaths
Unitarian clergy
South African clergy
South African Freemasons